The Great Man's Whiskers is a 1972 American made-for-television drama film about Abraham Lincoln, directed by Philip Leacock. It was based on a play by Adrian Scott.
The film featured a number of well known theatre and television character actors. Harve Presnell, featured as a ballad singer in the film, sings "The Wilderness Man" written by Earl Robinson with lyrics by Yip Harburg. Isabel Sanford sings "Things Go Bump in the Night" also written by Robinson and Harburg. This was Mr. Harburg’s last work.

Plot
A ten-year-old girl (Elizabeth Cooper) encourages Abraham Lincoln to grow a beard.  Lincoln’s inaugural journey, by train, from Illinois to Washington, D.C. takes him through New York state.  The journey includes a stop in the girl’s hometown of Westfield, New York. Lincoln, now with a full beard, takes the opportunity to meet the young girl.

The screenplay was inspired by the true story of Grace Bedell, who wrote Lincoln just before his election to the presidency in 1860.

Cast
Dean Jones as James E. Cooper
Cindy Eilbacher as Elizabeth Cooper, who wrote letter to Mr. Lincoln
Ann Sothern as Aunt Margaret Bancroft
Dennis Weaver as Abraham Lincoln
John McGiver as Andrew Hogan
Harve Presnell as Ballad Singer, featuring ‘’The Wilderness Man’’
John Hillerman as Major Underwood
Isabel Sanford as Ella
Charles Lane as Philbrick

Production
In 1947, it was announced Adrian Scott would make his directorial debut with an adaptation of the play. John Paxton would produce. However, RKO fired Scott because of the blacklist. For a time, it seemed RKO would still complete the project but the studio eventually dropped it.

The screenplay by John Paxton was eventually directed by Philip Leacock at Universal City Studios in 1969.  The film aired on NBC as a “TV Movie of the Week” on May 2, 1972 and was rebroadcast on February 13, 1973.

The Los Angeles Times called it "foolish and belaboured."

References

External links

The Great Man's Whiskers at TCMDB

1972 films
1972 drama films
1972 television films
1970s English-language films
American drama television films
American films based on plays
Depictions of Abraham Lincoln on film
Films directed by Philip Leacock
Films scored by Earl Robinson
NBC network original films
1970s American films